Smaug swazicus (also known as the Swazi dragon lizard) is a species of lizard in the family Cordylidae. It is a small lizard found in South Africa.

References

Smaug (genus)
Reptiles of South Africa
Reptiles described in 2020